The Survivor is a 2021 biographical drama film, directed by Barry Levinson, from a screenplay by Justine Juel Gillmer. Ben Foster stars as Harry Haft, a real-life survivor of the Auschwitz concentration camp, where he boxed fellow inmates to survive. Vicky Krieps, Billy Magnussen, Peter Sarsgaard, John Leguizamo, and Danny DeVito co-star. The film had its world premiere at the Toronto International Film Festival in September 2021, and was released on HBO on April 27, 2022.

Cast

Production
In November 2018, it was announced that Ben Foster had joined the cast of the film, along with Barry Levinson, who was supposed to direct the film from a screenplay by Justine Juel Gillmer, with Matti Leshem, Aaron L. Gilbert, Jason Sosnoff, Levinson and Scott Pardo producing under their New Mandate, Bron Studios and Creative Wealth Media banners, respectively. In March 2019, Billy Magnussen, Danny DeVito, Vicky Krieps, Peter Sarsgaard, Dar Zuzovsky and John Leguizamo joined the cast of the film. Hans Zimmer composed the film's score. The film was re-titled The Survivor from the working title, Harry Haft. Principal photography began in February 2019.

Release
The Survivor had its world premiere at the 2021 Toronto International Film Festival in September 2021. In October 2021, HBO Films acquired distribution rights to the film. The film debuted on HBO and HBO Max on April 27, 2022.

Reception

Accolades

References

External links
 

2021 films
2020s English-language films
2021 biographical drama films
American biographical drama films
Boxing films
Films about the aftermath of the Holocaust
Films directed by Barry Levinson
Films scored by Hans Zimmer
Films set in 1949
Films set in 1963
Films set in Brooklyn
Films set in Coney Island
Films set in Georgia (U.S. state)
Films set in Poland
Films set in Rhode Island
HBO Films films
Holocaust films
2020s American films